Violeta Andrei (born 29 March 1941) is a Romanian theater and film actress.

Biography
Andrei was born on 29 March 1941 in Brașov, Romania. After completing high school at the Școala Centrală National College in Bucharest, she graduated in 1965 from the Caragiale National University of Theatre and Film. Her theater debut was at Teatrul Giulești (now the Odeon Theatre). She then played in several roles at the Bulandra Theatre in Bucharest, until 1990.

Her film debut was the role in the movie Golgota (1966), after which she played in some 60 Romanian films.

She is the widow of former Ministry of Foreign Affairs of Romania Ștefan Andrei. They have a son together, Călin Andrei.

Selected filmography
 Golgota (1966)
 Felix și Otilia (1972)
 Tonight We'll Dance at Home (1972)
 Veronica se întoarce (1973)
  (1974)
  (1974)
 Stephen the Great - Vaslui 1475 (1975)
  (1975)
 Casa de la miezul nopții (1976)
 Ma-ma (1976 film) (1976)
  (1977), as Elena Caragiani-Stoenescu
  (1978)
 The Moment (1979)
 The Pale Light of Sorrow (1981)
 Păcatele Evei (2005)
 Poveste de cartier (2008) as Venezuela Stănescu, Davinci's wife

See also
Cinema of Romania

References

External links

Living people
1941 births
People from Brașov
Caragiale National University of Theatre and Film alumni
Romanian film actresses
Romanian stage actresses
20th-century Romanian actresses